1812, is a 1912 Russian film directed by Vasili Goncharov, Kai Hansen and Aleksandr Uralsky, described as a "blockbuster" in the Historical Dictionary of Russian and Soviet Cinema.

Plot 
The film in four parts illustrates the events Patriotic War of 1812.

Starring 
 Vasili Goncharov
 Aleksandra Goncharova
 Andrey Gromov
 Pavel Knorr as Napoleon
 V. Serjozhinikov
 A. Veskov

References

External links 
 

1912 films
1910s Russian-language films
Russian black-and-white films
Russian silent films
Films directed by Vasily Goncharov
Films directed by Kai Hansen
Fiction set in 1812
Films of the Russian Empire